This is a list of National Football League running backs by total career rushing yards, and includes the 31 running backs who have rushed for at least 10,000 yards, for which sixteen of them have been inducted into the Pro Football Hall of Fame. 

Emmitt Smith leads with 18,365 yards and is also the postseason leader with 1,586. He has held the all-time rushing yards record since 2002 and is the only player with over 17,000 regular season rushing yards.

Players with at least 10,000 rushing yards

Through  season

Players with at least 1,000 postseason rushing yards

Through end of  playoffs

Historical rushing yards leaders
Eight players have been recognized as having held the career rushing yards record in the NFL. Since reliable yardage statistics were not recorded prior to 1932, the first NFL player recognized as the career leader in rushing yards was Cliff Battles, who played from 1932 to 1937 for the Boston Braves / Boston Redskins / Washington Redskins. He led the NFL with 576 yards in 1932 and held on to the record throughout his career. Emmitt Smith has held the record since surpassing Walter Payton's long-standing total in 2002.

See also
 List of National Football League records (individual)
 List of National Football League rushing champions
 List of National Football League career rushing touchdowns leaders
 List of National Football League annual rushing touchdowns leaders

Notes

References
General
 
 

Footnotes

Rushing yards leaders

National Football League lists